Abdul Batin Khandakar is an Indian politician. He was elected to the Assam Legislative Assembly from Abhayapuri North in the 2021 Assam Legislative Assembly election as a member of the Indian National Congress.

Early life and education
He is the son of Late Ibrahim Ali Khandakar. He completed his  Bachelor of Engineering (civil) from Visveswaraya Regional College of Engineering under Nagpur University.

References 

Assam politicians
Living people
Year of birth missing (living people)
Indian National Congress politicians from Assam